The following Union Army units and commanders fought in the Battle of Fort Donelson of the American Civil War. Order of battle compiled from the casualty returns, and the reports. The Confederate order of battle is listed separately.

Abbreviations used

Military Rank
 BG = Brigadier General
 Col = Colonel
 Ltc = Lieutenant Colonel
 Maj = Major
 Cpt = Captain
 Lt = 1st Lieutenant

Other
 w = wounded
 k = killed

Union Forces

District of Cairo
BG Ulysses S. Grant, Commanding
 Chief of Staff: Col Joseph D. Webster
 Chief of Engineers: Col James B. McPherson
 Assistant Adjutant General: Cpt John A. Rawlins

Western Flotilla
Flag Officer Andrew H. Foote (w)

Rear Guard
These units were attached to the District of Cairo but were posted to guard duty and did not take part in the campaign against Fort Donelson.

See also

 Tennessee in the American Civil War

Notes

References
 Cooling, Benjamin Franklin, The Campaign for Fort Donelson, U.S. National Park Service and Eastern National, 1999, .
 Eicher, John H., and David J. Eicher, Civil War High Commands. Stanford, CA: Stanford University Press, 2001. .
 Gott, Kendall D., Where the South Lost the War: An Analysis of the Fort Henry—Fort Donelson Campaign, February 1862, Stackpole books, 2003, .
 Robert Underwood Johnson, Clarence Clough Buell, Battles and Leaders of the Civil War: The Opening Battles, Volume 1 (Pdf), New York: The Century Co., 1887.
U.S. War Department, The War of the Rebellion: a Compilation of the Official Records of the Union and Confederate Armies, U.S. Government Printing Office, 1880–1901.

American Civil War orders of battle